My Dearest Son is a 1985 Italian drama film. It represents the last film written and directed by Valentino Orsini.  It is also the film debut of Italian actor Sergio Rubini.

Plot

Cast 
Ben Gazzara as Avv. Antonio Morelli
Sergio Rubini as  Marco Morelli
Valeria Golino as Francesca
Mariangela Melato as Stefania

References

External links

1985 films
Italian drama films
Films directed by Valentino Orsini
Films scored by Guido & Maurizio De Angelis
Films with screenplays by Vincenzo Cerami
1980s Italian-language films
1980s Italian films